Americium (95Am) is an artificial element, and thus a standard atomic weight cannot be given. Like all artificial elements, it has no known stable isotopes. The first isotope to be synthesized was 241Am in 1944. The artificial element decays by ejecting alpha particles. Americium has an atomic number of 95 (the number of protons in the nucleus of the americium atom).

Nineteen radioisotopes of americium—223Am, 229Am, 230Am, and those ranging from 232Am to 247Am—have been characterized, with the most stable being 243Am with a half-life of 7,370 years, and 241Am with a half-life of 432.2 years. All of the remaining radioactive isotopes have half-lives that are less than 51 hours, and the majority of these have half-lives that are less than 100 minutes. This element also has 8 meta states, with the most stable being 242m1Am (t1/2 = 141 years). This isomer is unusual in that its half life is far longer than that of the ground state of the same isotope.

List of isotopes 

|-
| 223Am
| style="text-align:right" | 95
| style="text-align:right" | 128
| 
| 5.2(+12.0-4.4) ms
| α
| 219Np
|
|-
| 229Am
| style="text-align:right" | 95
| style="text-align:right" | 134
| 229.04525(9)
| 1.8(1.5) s
| α
| 225Np
|
|-
| rowspan=2|230Am
| rowspan=2 style="text-align:right" | 95
| rowspan=2 style="text-align:right" | 135
| rowspan=2|230.04609(14)#
| rowspan=2|32(+22-9) s
| β+ (64.7%)
| 230Pu
| rowspan=2|
|-
| β+, SF (35.3%)
| (various)
|-
| rowspan=3|232Am
| rowspan=3 style="text-align:right" | 95
| rowspan=3 style="text-align:right" | 137
| rowspan=3|232.04659(32)#
| rowspan=3|79(2) s
| β+ (98%)
| 232Pu
| rowspan=3|
|-
| α (2%)
| 228Np
|-
| β+, SF (.069%)
| (various)
|-
| rowspan=2|233Am
| rowspan=2 style="text-align:right" | 95
| rowspan=2 style="text-align:right" | 138
| rowspan=2|233.04635(11)#
| rowspan=2|3.2(8) min
| β+
| 233Pu
| rowspan=2|
|-
| α
| 229Np
|-
| rowspan=3|234Am
| rowspan=3 style="text-align:right" | 95
| rowspan=3 style="text-align:right" | 139
| rowspan=3|234.04781(22)#
| rowspan=3|2.32(8) min
| β+ (99.95%)
| 234Pu
| rowspan=3|
|-
| α (.04%)
| 230Np
|-
| β+, SF (.0066%)
| (various)
|-
| rowspan=2|235Am
| rowspan=2 style="text-align:right" | 95
| rowspan=2 style="text-align:right" | 140
| rowspan=2|235.04795(13)#
| rowspan=2|9.9(5) min
| β+
| 235Pu
| rowspan=2|5/2−#
|-
| α (rare)
| 231Np
|-
| rowspan=2|236Am
| rowspan=2 style="text-align:right" | 95
| rowspan=2 style="text-align:right" | 141
| rowspan=2|236.04958(11)#
| rowspan=2|3.6(1) min
| β+
| 236Pu
| rowspan=2|
|-
| α
| 232Np
|-
| rowspan=2|237Am
| rowspan=2 style="text-align:right" | 95
| rowspan=2 style="text-align:right" | 142
| rowspan=2|237.05000(6)#
| rowspan=2|73.0(10) min
| β+ (99.97%)
| 237Pu
| rowspan=2|5/2(−)
|-
| α (.025%)
| 233Np
|-
| rowspan=2|238Am
| rowspan=2 style="text-align:right" | 95
| rowspan=2 style="text-align:right" | 143
| rowspan=2|238.05198(5)
| rowspan=2|98(2) min
| β+
| 238Pu
| rowspan=2|1+
|-
| α (10−4%)
| 234Np
|-
| style="text-indent:1em" | 238mAm
| colspan="3" style="text-indent:2em" | 2500(200)# keV
| 35(10) μs
|
|
|
|-
| rowspan=2|239Am
| rowspan=2 style="text-align:right" | 95
| rowspan=2 style="text-align:right" | 144
| rowspan=2|239.0530245(26)
| rowspan=2|11.9(1) h
| EC (99.99%)
| 239Pu
| rowspan=2|(5/2)−
|-
| α (.01%)
| 235Np
|-
| style="text-indent:1em" | 239mAm
| colspan="3" style="text-indent:2em" | 2500(200) keV
| 163(12) ns
|
|
| (7/2+)
|-
| rowspan=2|240Am
| rowspan=2 style="text-align:right" | 95
| rowspan=2 style="text-align:right" | 145
| rowspan=2|240.055300(15)
| rowspan=2|50.8(3) h
| β+
| 240Pu
| rowspan=2|(3−)
|-
| α (1.9×10−4%)
| 236Np
|-
| rowspan=3|241Am
| rowspan=3 style="text-align:right" | 95
| rowspan=3 style="text-align:right" | 146
| rowspan=3|241.0568291(20)
| rowspan=3|432.2(7) y
| α
| 237Np
| rowspan=3|5/2−
|-
| CD (7.4×10−10%)
| 207Tl, 34Si
|-
| SF (4.3×10−10%)
| (various)
|-
| style="text-indent:1em" | 241mAm
| colspan="3" style="text-indent:2em" | 2200(100) keV
| 1.2(3) μs
| SF
|
|
|-
| rowspan=2|242Am
| rowspan=2 style="text-align:right" | 95
| rowspan=2 style="text-align:right" | 147
| rowspan=2|242.0595492(20)
| rowspan=2|16.02(2) h
| β− (82.7%)
| 242Cm
| rowspan=2|1−
|-
| EC (17.3%)
| 242Pu
|-
| rowspan=3 style="text-indent:1em" | 242m1Am
| rowspan=3 colspan="3" style="text-indent:2em" | 48.60(5) keV
| rowspan=3|141(2) y
| IT (99.54%)
| 242Am
| rowspan=3|5−
|-
| α (.46%)
| 238Np
|-
| SF (1.5×10−8%)
| (various)
|-
| style="text-indent:1em" | 242m2Am
| colspan="3" style="text-indent:2em" | 2200(80) keV
| 14.0(10) ms
|
|
| (2+, 3−)
|-
| rowspan=2|243Am
| rowspan=2 style="text-align:right" | 95
| rowspan=2 style="text-align:right" | 148
| rowspan=2|243.0613811(25)
| rowspan=2|7,370(40) y
| α
| 239Np
| rowspan=2|5/2−
|-
| SF (3.7×10−9%)
| (various)
|-
| 244Am
| style="text-align:right" | 95
| style="text-align:right" | 149
| 244.0642848(22)
| 10.1(1) h
| β−
| 244Cm
| (6−)#
|-
| rowspan=2 style="text-indent:1em" | 244mAm
| rowspan=2 colspan="3" style="text-indent:2em" | 86.1(10) keV
| rowspan=2|26(1) min
| β− (99.96%)
| 244Cm
| rowspan=2|1+
|-
| EC (.0361%)
| 244Pu
|-
| 245Am
| style="text-align:right" | 95
| style="text-align:right" | 150
| 245.066452(4)
| 2.05(1) h
| β−
| 245Cm
| (5/2)+
|-
| 246Am
| style="text-align:right" | 95
| style="text-align:right" | 151
| 246.069775(20)
| 39(3) min
| β−
| 246Cm
| (7−)
|-
| rowspan=2 style="text-indent:1em" | 246m1Am
| rowspan=2 colspan="3" style="text-indent:2em" | 30(10) keV
| rowspan=2|25.0(2) min
| β− (99.99%)
| 246Cm
| rowspan=2|2(−)
|-
| IT (.01%)
| 246Am
|-
| style="text-indent:1em" | 246m2Am
| colspan="3" style="text-indent:2em" | ~2000 keV
| 73(10) μs
|
|
|
|-
| 247Am
| style="text-align:right" | 95
| style="text-align:right" | 152
| 247.07209(11)#
| 23.0(13) min
| β−
| 247Cm
| (5/2)#

Actinides vs fission products

Notable isotopes

Americium-241 

Americium-241 is the most prevalent isotope of americium in nuclear waste. It is the isotope used in an americium smoke detector based on an ionization chamber. It is a potential fuel for long-lifetime radioisotope thermoelectric generators.

Possible parent nuclides: beta from 241Pu, electron capture from 241Cm, alpha from 245Bk.

Americium-241 decays by alpha emission, with a by-product of gamma rays. Its presence in plutonium is determined by the original concentration of plutonium-241 and the sample age. Because of the low penetration of alpha radiation, Americium-241 only poses a health risk when ingested or inhaled. Older samples of plutonium containing plutonium-241 contain a buildup of 241Am. A chemical removal of americium from reworked plutonium (e.g. during reworking of plutonium pits) may be required.

Americium-242m

Americium-242m has a mass of 242.0595492 g/mol. It is one of the rare cases, like 180mTa, 210mBi and multiple holmium isomers, where a higher-energy nuclear isomer is more stable than the lower-energy one, Americium-242.

242mAm is fissile and has a low critical mass, comparable to that of 239Pu. It has a very high cross section for fission, and if in a nuclear reactor is destroyed relatively quickly. Work has been done investigating if this isotope could be used for a novel type of nuclear rocket.

Americium-243

Americium-243 has a mass of 243.06138 g/mol and a half-life of 7,370 years, the longest lasting of all americium isotopes. It is formed in the nuclear fuel cycle by neutron capture on plutonium-242 followed by beta decay. Production increases exponentially with increasing burnup as a total of 5 neutron captures on 238U are required.

It decays by either emitting an alpha particle (with a decay energy of 5.27 MeV) to become 239Np, which then quickly decays to 239Pu, or infrequently, by spontaneous fission.

As for the other americium isotopes, and more generally for all alpha emitters, 243Am is carcinogenic in case of internal contamination after being inhaled or ingested. 243Am also presents a risk of external irradiation associated with the gamma ray emitted by its short-lived decay product 239Np. The external irradiation risk for the other two americium isotopes (241Am and 242mAm) is less than 10% of that for americium-243.

References

Sources 
 Isotope masses from:
 
 Isotopic compositions and standard atomic masses from:
 
 
 Half-life, spin, and isomer data selected from the following sources.
 
IAEA - Nuclear Data Section. Live Chart of Nuclides. Vienna International Centre.
 

 
Americium
Americium